Emily Fox (born April 23, 1987) is a former world record holder at sport stacking. She set the overall world record in the cycle (7.43 seconds) in April 2002 and the 3–6–3 (2.72 seconds). However, in 2006, her cycle record was beaten (by Robin Stangenberg from Germany with a time of 7.41 seconds). Her 3–6–3 record was also broken in 2007 by Robin Stangenberg and Yannick Zittlau of Germany with  a time of 2.70 seconds.  She has appeared on several television shows, including The Ellen DeGeneres Show and The Late Late Show with Craig Ferguson, to demonstrate her skills.

Emily is the eldest child of Bob Fox, the founder of Speed Stacks, and grew up in Highlands Ranch, Colorado. Her two brothers, Kit and Brennan, are also successful at sport stacking. Kit also wrote a book and twice completed the Chicago Marathon.

Fox is also a skilled basketball player. In her senior year at ThunderRidge high school she led the team to a number 7 finish in the USA Today high school national poll and was named a Parade Magazine high school All-American. She played college basketball for the University of Minnesota.  In her four years she averaged 11.7 points per game.  In April 2009 she was drafted in the third round of the WNBA draft by the Minnesota Lynx.  In 2007, she was a member of the gold medal winning basketball team at the Pan American Games.

Sport stacking

Marquee tournament results

Basketball

Minnesota statistics
Source

References

External links
  
  
  
  

Living people
1987 births
American women's basketball players
Basketball players at the 2007 Pan American Games
Minnesota Golden Gophers women's basketball players
Parade High School All-Americans (girls' basketball)
Point guards
Sport stacking
Pan American Games gold medalists for the United States
People from Highlands Ranch, Colorado
Pan American Games medalists in basketball
Medalists at the 2007 Pan American Games
United States women's national basketball team players